Guillem d'Agulló (1310s-1393) was a Spanish nobleman, Abbot of Poblet, he was the man who was commissioned by Pedro IV for reforms, building projects and construction of royal tombs in Monastery of Poblet.

Biography 

Born in Catalonia, Guillem d'Agulló was appointed Abbot of Poblet by Peter of Aragon. Agullo, built fortified towers, and everything concerning the defense of the Abbey.

References 
 

14th-century Catalan people
Catalan nobility
1393 deaths